André Bicaba (born 12 January 1945) is a former Burkinabé sprinter.

Bicaba became the first athlete to represent the Republic of Upper Volta at the Olympic Games when he competed in the Men's 100 metres at the 1972 Summer Olympics. He finished fifth in his heat with a time of 10.71 seconds.

Prior to the 1972 Summer Olympics, Bicaba lived in Bobo-Dioulasso and worked as a physical education teacher. He is a member of the Bwaba tribe. He began his athletic training a year before the Olympics after a new government initiative emphasized physical fitness and greatly improved the country's athletic facilities. West Germany funded his trip to the Olympics through a scholarship which also allowed him a month to train in and acclimatize to Munich. When interviewed about his Olympic prospects before competing, he said that "we cannot dream of a medal" but "who can predict results?"

As he was the only competitor from the African nation he was also the flag bearer at the opening and closing ceremonies.

References

1945 births
Living people
Place of birth missing (living people)
Burkinabé male sprinters
Olympic athletes of Burkina Faso
Athletes (track and field) at the 1972 Summer Olympics
21st-century Burkinabé people